Papilio mahadeva, the Burmese raven, is a species of swallowtail butterfly from the genus Papilio that is found in Thailand, Burma and Guangxi.

Subspecies
Papilio mahadeva mahadeva (Thailand)
Papilio mahadeva mehala Grose-Smith, 1886 (Burma)
Papilio mahadeva selangoranus Fruhstorfer, 1901 (northern Peninsular Malaya)
Papilio mahadeva choui Li, 1994 (Guangxi)

Biology
Papilio mahadeva is a mimic of Euploea core. Recorded larval food plants are species of Glycosmis including Glycosmis pentaphylla and Glycosmis citrifolia.

Habitat
It lives in lowland dipterocarp forests and forest edges at up to 500 m.

Systematics
Papilio mahadeva is a member of the castor species group. The clade members are:
Papilio castor Westwood, 1842 
Papilio dravidarum Wood-Mason, 1880 
Papilio mahadeva Moore, [1879]

References

External links
Butterflycorner Images from Naturhistorisches Museum Wien

mahadeva
Butterflies described in 1879
Butterflies of Asia
Taxa named by Frederic Moore